The University of Caen Normandy (French: Université de Caen Normandie), also known as Unicaen, is a public university in Caen, France.

History

The institution was founded in 1432 by John of Lancaster, 1st Duke of Bedford, the first rector being a Cornishman, Michael Tregury, afterwards Archbishop of Dublin. It originally consisted of a faculty of Canon Law and a faculty of Law. By 1438, it already had five faculties. The foundation was confirmed by the King of France Charles VII the Victorious in 1452.

On July 7, 1944, the university was completely destroyed by aerial bombing during Operation Charnwood, an action of the Battle of Caen. Between 1944 and 1954, the university was based in the buildings of the regional teachers’ college. A new campus was designed by Henry Bernard and constructed between 1948 and 1957. The new university was inaugurated on 1 and 2 June 1957. Its logo, the mythical Phoenix, symbolises this revival.

Rankings

Notable people

Notable alumni

Notable faculty
 Doris Bensimon (1924–2009), Austrian-born French sociologist and academic

Miscellaneous
 The mathematician Pierre Varignon, whose work would influence the young Leonhard Euler, earned his M.A. from Caen in 1682.
 Pierre-Simon Laplace (1749–1827) was introduced to mathematics in Caen by Christophe Gadbled and Pierre Le Canu. 
 Henri Poincaré (1854–1912) taught there between 1879 and 1881.
 The university contains a famous scale model of Rome.
 Those intending to become advocates or solicitors in Guernsey (or, until recently, Jersey) must complete three months' study of Norman law at Caen University (Certificat d'Études Juridiques Françaises et Normandes) prior to being called to the Guernsey or Jersey Bar, respectively.
 The Carré international is located here. The center is a hub for exchange students from around the world who wish to attend university in France. They take students from A1 (no French experience) to C2 (Native language).
 The university takes part in the XL-Chem Graduate School of Research project, funded by the State via the National Research Agency.
 Thomas Campion physician, poet, and composer of lute songs received his medical degree in 1605.

See also 
 List of medieval universities
 List of universities and colleges in France

References

External links
Official English web site, welcome.unicaen.fr

University of Caen
1432 establishments in Europe
1430s establishments in France
Educational institutions established in 1957
Educational institutions established in the 15th century
University of Caen Normandy
1957 establishments in France